Szczecin Główny (Polish for Szczecin main station) is the principal railway station of the city of Szczecin, in the West Pomeranian Voivodeship, Poland. The station opened on 15 August 1843 and is located on the Berlin-Szczecin railway, Wrocław–Szczecin railway, Poznań–Szczecin railway, Bützow-Szczecin railway and Szczecin-Trzebież Szczeciński railway. The train services are operated by PKP Intercity, Polregio and Deutsche Bahn.

History
In 1836, the Berlin Committee for the Construction of the Berlin-Szczecin railway was founded. On 15 August 1843, the first train from Berlin pulled into the station, which at the time was known as the Berliner Bahnhof. This line ended in Berlin at Berlin Stettiner Bahnhof, later renamed Berlin Nordbahnhof). This was the start of the railways in Pomerania. The station was also the first step in the demolition of the Prussian city fortifications of Fort Prussia (Fort Preußen). In 1846 the railway line to Stargard was opened, in 1848 this was extended to Poznan.

The station building dates from around 1900, which after alterations and reconstruction after the damage caused during World War II still exists today.

Between 1975 and 1980, most of the railways around Szczecin were electrified.

Modernisation
In 2007 the station was partially renovated in connection with the end of the regatta The Tall Ships Races. The entrance hall of the station and the footbridge were modernised.

On 20 December 2010, an agreement was signed for the reconstruction of the station and its surroundings. It was planned that by the end of 2014 the works would be completed.

On 1 October 2014 PKP signed a contract for the reconstruction of the railway. As part of this investment, the station building, platforms 1 and 4 were rebuilt and a new footbridge was built. In the future it is planned for the second phase of the modernisation of the station. The main building of the station was completely closed for renovation, with a temporary station opened. On 29 April 2016 the modernised station was opened.

Train services
The station is served by the following service(s):

Express Intercity services (EIC) Szczecin — Warsaw 
Intercity services Świnoujście - Szczecin - Stargard - Krzyż - Poznań - Kutno - Warsaw - Białystok / Lublin - Rzeszów
Intercity services Świnoujście - Szczecin - Stargard - Krzyż - Poznań - Leszno - Wrocław - Opole - Katowice - Kraków - Rzeszów - Przemyśl
Intercity services Szczecin - Stargard - Krzyż - Poznań - Kutno - Łowicz - Łódź - Kraków
Intercity services Szczecin - Stargard - Kalisz Pomorski - Piła - Bydgoszcz - Toruń - Kutno - Łowicz - Warsaw - Lublin
Intercity services (IC) Szczecin - Koszalin - Słupsk - Gdynia - Gdańsk
Intercity services (IC) Szczecin - Koszalin - Słupsk - Gdynia - Gdańsk - Elbląg/Iława - Olsztyn
Intercity services (IC) Szczecin - Koszalin - Słupsk - Gdynia - Gdańsk - Elbląg - Olsztyn - Białystok
Intercity services Świnoujście - Szczecin - Kostrzyn - Rzepin - Zielona Góra - Legnica - Wrocław - Opole - Katowice / Częstochowa - Kraków - Rzeszów - Przemyśl
Intercity services Świnoujście - Szczecin - Kostrzyn - Rzepin - Zielona Góra - Legnica - Wrocław - Opole - Częstochowa - Kielce - Radom - Lublin
Regional services (R) Świnoujście - Goleniów - Szczecin - Stargard - Choszczno - Krzyż - Szamotuły - Poznań
Regional services (R) Szczecin - Stargard - Białogard - Koszalin - Slupsk
Regional services (R) Szczecin - Goleniów - Goleniów Airport - Gryfice - Kołobrzeg
Regional services (R) Szczecin - Stargard - Kalisz Pomorski - Piła
Regional services (R) Szczecin - Kostrzyn - Rzepin - Zielona Góra
Regional services  Lübeck - Bad Kleinen - Güstrow - Neubrandenburg - Pasewalk - Szczecin
Regional services  Berlin - Eberswalde - Angermünde - Tantow - Szczecin
Regional services   Angermünde - Tantow - Szczecin

Public transport
Bus and tram services depart from the station.

Gallery

References

External links

Railway stations in Poland opened in 1843
Główny
1843 establishments in Prussia